Hun Sen Cup, the main football knockout tournament in Cambodia. The 2011 Hun Sen Cup was the fifth season of the Hun Sen Cup, the premier knockout tournament for association football clubs in Cambodia involving Cambodian League and provincial teams organized by the Football Federation of Cambodia.

National Defense were the defending champions, having beaten Phnom Penh Crown 3–2 in the previous season's final.

Group stage
The matches were arranged in four regions, two groups in each region. The teams finishing in the top two positions in each of the eight groups in Group stage progressed to the Round of 16 playing in Phnom Penh.

Battambang Centre

Group A - Prek Pra Keila, Kon Rithysen, Banteay Meanchey, Mekong Kampuchea University

Group B - Build Bright United, Battambang, Oddar Meanchey, Pailin

Kampong Thom Centre

Group C - Preah Khan Reach, Preah Vihear, Chhlam Samuth, Kratie

Group D - Phnom Penh Crown, Kampong Thom, Baksey Chamkrong, Neak Khiev

Prey Veng Centre

Group E – Chhma Khmao, Western University, Stung Treng, Kandal

Group F - National Defense, Prey Veng, Police Commissary, Life University

Takeo Centre

Group G - Nagacorp, Takeo, Kep, Sihanoukville Autonomous Port

Group H - Kirivong Sok Sen Chey, Kampong Speu, Kampot, Koh Kong

Round of 16

Quarter-finals

Semi-finals

Third place play-off

Final

Awards
 Top Goal Scorer (The Golden Boot): Khoun Laboravy of Preah Khan Reach (22 goals)
 Goalkeeper of the Season (The Golden Glove): Ouk Mic of Preah Khan Reach
 Fair Play: National Defense Ministry FC

See also
 2011 Cambodian League
 Cambodian League
 Hun Sen Cup

References

Hun Sen Cup seasons
2011 in Cambodian football